Hans Vogt (born 15 January 1962 in Munich, West Germany) is a German Olympic sailor in the Star class. He competed in the 1992 Summer Olympics, where he finished 6th together with Jörg Fricke.

References

Olympic sailors of Germany
German male sailors (sport)
Star class sailors
Sailors at the 1992 Summer Olympics – Star
1962 births
Living people